Pudipeddi Ravi Shankar (born 28 November 1966), also known as Sai Ravi, is an Indian actor, dubbing artist, director and writer. As an actor, he predominantly appears in Kannada films, in addition to Telugu and Tamil films. As a dubbing artist, he dubbed for over 3500 films, with more than 1000 of those each in Telugu and Tamil, and over 150 in Kannada. 

Son of the actor P. J. Sarma and the latter's brother Sai Kumar, Ravi Shankar made his directorial debut with the Kannada film Durgi in 2004. Shankar worked as a dialogue writer and wrote dialogues for over 75 Telugu films and their 150 Tamil counterparts. He also worked as a playback singer for films in Telugu such as Rakta Charitra and Bejawada. He gained recognition for his role in the 2011 Kannada film Kempe Gowda, for which he won Filmfare Award for Best Supporting Actor – Kannada.

Early and personal life
P. Ravi Shankar grew up as a child in Chennai, Tamil Nadu. Ravi Shankar's mother Krishna Jyothy Pudipeddi is a Telugu actress who acted with Kannada thespian Dr. Rajkumar and others in films such as Sri Krishna Garudi, Makkala Rajya and others. Ravi Shankar's father, Pudipeddi Jogeswara Sharma, was also an actor and dubbing artist who worked in many Telugu, Kannada and Tamil films. His elder brother Pudipeddi Sai Kumar entered the film industry as dubbing artist and later became an actor in Kannada Film Industry.

Shankar is married to Suchil, a Punjabi woman, and the couple has a son, Adhvey. In 2018, Ravishankar announced that he will launch Adhvey as an actor in his own directorial film in Kannada.

Career
P. Ravi Shankar made his film debut as a lead actor in 1986 with R. Narayana Murthy's film Telugu film Aalochinchandi. He later was seen in supporting roles in films such as Madhura Nagarilo and Keechurallu. With no more offers, Ravi took a hiatus from acting and re-entered as a villain in 2001 with Gopi Chand's debut film Tholi Valapu. Lack of success in his acting career forced him to pursue dubbing as a profession like his father and brother. He started dubbing professionally with the Telugu film Rowdyism Zindabad, where he dubbed for Tamil actor Mohan Raj. He continued to dub for many character artists from other languages such as Raghuvaran, Mohan Raj, Devaraj, Charan Raj, Captain Raju, Nassar, Ashish Vidyarthi, Prakash Raj, Ashutosh Rana, Sonu Sood, Mukesh Rishi, Upendra and Pradeep Rawat etc. He dubbed for over 4000 films with more than 1000 films each in Telugu and Tamil and over 150 films in Kannada. In 2004, he directed a Kannada film titled Durgi, starring Malashri. The film was later remade in Telugu as Narasimhudu, starring N. T. Rama Rao Jr., Ameesha Patel and Sameera Reddy. Ravi provided the story for the film which was directed by B. Gopal. The film was heavily criticised and bombed at the box office.

His dubbing work in the 2009 film Arundhati, where he voiced for Sonu Sood, was praised in a review of Idlebrain. He won the Nandi Award for Best Male Dubbing Artist for his performance in the film and was referred to as "Bommali Ravi Shankar" by the Telugu media.

His breakthrough role was from the 2011 Kannada film Kempe Gowda. The film became so popular that Ravishankar was hence called "Kempegowda Ravishankar" or "Arumugam Ravishankar" and he grew to become a household name in Karnataka. His performance was not only widely praised by the critics.

Ravi Shankar, after Kempe Gowda, became a busy supporting actor in the Kannada cinema. He then acted in films such as Manikya, Dandupalya, Adhyaksha, Charulatha, Bachchan, Edegarike, Varadanayaka and others. He was also seen in Telugu films such as Kurradu and Happy Happy Gaa and in Tamil films such as Vettaikaaran and Kollaikaran.

Awards and nominations
He won his first Nandi Award for Best Male Dubbing Artist in 1999 for Ram Gopal Varma's Prema Katha. He dubbed for Manoj Bajpai in the film. He won his second Nandi Award in 2002 for Chiranjeevi's Indra, in which he dubbed for Mukesh Rishi. His next Nandi Award was in 2004 for his dubbing in S. S. Rajamouli's Sye. He dubbed for Pradeep Rawat in the film. He won four consecutive Nandi Awards from 2006 to 2009 for the films Pokiri, Athidhi, Arundhati and Anjaneyulu respectively. He also won Tamil Nadu State Film Award for Best Male Dubbing Artist for his dubbing for Ashish Vidyarthi in 2001 film Dhill.

Partial filmography

As actor
List is incomplete

As dubbing artist

As director

As playback singer

References

External links
 

Living people
Telugu playback singers
Filmfare Awards South winners
Indian male voice actors
Telugu male actors
Male actors in Kannada cinema
Kannada film directors
Male actors in Tamil cinema
Male actors in Telugu cinema
Indian male film actors
20th-century Indian male actors
21st-century Indian male actors
21st-century Indian film directors
Nandi Award winners
Film directors from Andhra Pradesh
Male actors from Andhra Pradesh
1966 births